Fan Lingjiang (Chinese: 范凌江; born 8 October 1989) is a Chinese football player who currently plays for Beijing Enterprises Group in the China League One division.

Club career
In 2009, Fan Lingjiang started his professional footballer career with Shanghai Shenhua in the Chinese Super League. On 10 May 2011, Fan made his debut for Shanghai Shenhua in the last group match of 2011 AFC Champions League against Suwon Samsung Bluewings, which ended in a 3-0 defeat.
In the 2013 season Fan moved to China League Two side Jiangxi Liansheng on a one-year loan deal.

On 23 February 2016, Fan transferred to China League One club Qingdao Huanghai. Starting at left back, Fan made his debut for the club in a league game on March 13, 2016 in a 3-0 defeat to Tianjin Quanjian.

On 28 February 2018, Fan transferred to China League One side Beijing Enterprises Group.

Career statistics 
Statistics accurate as of match played 31 December 2020.

References

External links
 

1989 births
Living people
Chinese footballers
Footballers from Shanghai
Shanghai Shenhua F.C. players
Jiangxi Beidamen F.C. players
Qingdao F.C. players
Beijing Sport University F.C. players
Chinese Super League players
China League One players
China League Two players
Association football midfielders